The basketball tournament at the 2009 Mediterranean Games was held in the Elettra Sports Hall, Ortona Sports Hall, Teramo Sports Hall and the Roseto Sports Hall from June 27 to July 4, 2009 in Pescara, Italy.

Medalists

Medal count

Men

Teams

Group A

Group B

Rosters

*(In parenthesis is reported the year of birth)

: Franko Bushati (85), Ardian Domi (84), Orion Garo (80), Andrea Gjinaj (86), Algert Gjonaj (87), Endrit Hysenagolli (88), Erkand Kataj (82), Arjonel Lame (84), Genti Lasku (85), Ersid Luca (81), Gerti Shima (86), Marlin Sukaj (83). Coach: Roland Avrami

: Lukša Andrić (85), Petar Babić (85), Marko Car (85), Jure Lalić (86), Drago Pašalić (84), Damir Rančić (83), Damjan Rudež (86), Krunoslav Simon (85), Rok Stipčević (86), Ante Tomić (87), Jakov Vladovic (83), Luka Žorić (84). Coach: Josip Vranković

: Dimitrios Kalaitzidis (85), Dimitrios Karadolamis (87), Fanis Koumpouras (83), Alexis Kyritsis (82), Dimitrios Lolas (86), Dimitrios Mavroeidis (85), Igor Milošević (86), Petros Noeas (87), Nikos Papanikolaou (85), Gaios Skordilis (87), Stavros Toutziarakis (87), Ian Vougioukas (85). Coach: Ioannis Giannapoulos

: Marco Allegretti (81), Pietro Aradori (88), Federico Bolzonella (84), Andrea Cinciarini (86), Daniele Cinciarini (83), Alessandro Cittadini (79), Andrea Crosariol (84), Luigi Datome (87), Lorenzo D'Ercole (88), Giuliano Maresca (81), Andrea Renzi (89), Tommaso Rinaldi (85). Coach: Carlo Recalcati

: Filip Barović (90), Nikola Đoković (89), Nikola Ivanović (89), Stefan Knežević (89), Nikola Lalić (89), Miloš Lopičić (90), Slobodan Miljanić (90), Miloš Savović (89), Sead Šehović (89), Petar Stojanović (90), Milorad Sutulović (90), Nikola Vučević (90). Coach: Dejan Radonjić

: Yunss Akinocho (87), Zouheir Bourouis (83), Walid Dahmani (87), Zakaria El Masbahi (79), Mohamad Hachad (83), Mohammed Houari (77), Younes Idrissi (84), Mustapha Khalfi (80), Abderrahim Najah (84), Abdelmajid Naji (89), Sophian Rafai (86), Abdelhakim Zouita (86). Coach: Francis Jordan

: Stefan Birčević (89), Duško Bunić (89), Filip Čović (89), Branko Lazić (89), Vladimir Lučić (89), Nikola Maravić (89), Nikola Marković (89), Dragan Milosavljević (89), Aleksandar Mitrović (90), Nemanja Nedović (91), Stefan Stojačić (89), Bojan Subotić (90). Coach: Slobodan Klipa

: Mutlu Akpinar (83), Can Altıntığ (87), Engin Atsür (84), Yunus Çankaya (85), Mutlu Demir (87), Hakan Demirel (86), Sinan Güler (83), Barış Hersek (88), Cemal Nalga (87), Cihad Sahin (83), Fatih Solak (80), Erkan Veyseloğlu (83). Coach: Alaeddin Yakan

Preliminary round

Group A

June 28, 2009

June 29, 2009

June 30, 2009

Group B

June 28, 2009

June 29, 2009

June 30, 2009

Knockout stage

1st place bracket

5th place bracket

Women

Teams

Group A

Group B

Preliminary round

Group A

June 27, 2009

June 28, 2009

June 29, 2009

Group B

June 27, 2009

June 28, 2009

June 29, 2009

Knockout stage

1st place bracket

5th place bracket

External links
Official Website of the 2009 Mediterranean Games

Basketball
Basketball at the Mediterranean Games
International basketball competitions hosted by Italy
2009–10 in Italian basketball
2009–10 in European basketball
2009 in African basketball